is a golf video game developed and published by HAL Laboratory for the Super Nintendo Entertainment System in 1991.

Summary
The game is essentially a standard 18-hole golf video game, which is played from a top-down perspective. Players can compete in stroke play with up to four players, or match play against a friend or the computer, in which case the player is in a competitive match against Hal. Players can enter up to four characters (letters and numbers) for their name. When playing against the computer, the player will play against an opponent that uses metal clubs, which hit farther than the standard wooden clubs. Wind speeds are shown in meters per second. Water hazards notifications appear in big gray letters.

In addition to stroke and match play, players can obtain passwords that allow spectacular shots to be re-enacted as if they were the spectator (eagles, holes in one, and double eagles). Beginners can learn gameplay strategies from watching expert players while they use their hard-earned passwords. Mode 7 effects permits the usage of elevation in certain camera angles.

Development 
During the mid-1980s, various Hole in One video games were released in Japan by HAL Laboratory for the NEC PC88 and MSX. The Super Famicom version can be considered as the sequel to the Family Computer video game Jumbo Ozaki no Hole in One Professional released in 1988. The Japanese version was named after legendary Japanese golfer Jumbo Ozaki, who has played golf on a professional basis since 1973. Takashi Saitou designed the stages.

Reception

AllGame gave Hal's Hole in One Golf a score of 3.5 stars out of a possible 5.

References

Notes 

1991 video games
Golf video games
HAL Laboratory games
Super Nintendo Entertainment System games
Super Nintendo Entertainment System-only games
Top-down video games
Video game sequels
Video games developed in Japan
Multiplayer and single-player video games
Cultural depictions of Japanese men
Cultural depictions of golfers
Video games based on real people